Last of the Summer Wine's eighteenth series aired on BBC1. All of the episodes were written by Roy Clarke and produced and directed by Alan J. W. Bell.

Outline
The trio in this series consisted of:

Returning this series

Barry Wilkinson (1986–1990, 1996–2010)

Last appearances

Foggy Dewhirst (1976–1985, 1990–1997)

List of Episodes
Christmas Special (1996)

Regular series

DVD release
The box set for series eighteen was released by Universal Playback in February 2011, mislabelled as a box set for series 19 & 20.

References

See also

Last of the Summer Wine series
1997 British television seasons